Danie Jacobs (10 April 1904 – 21 June 1999) was a South African middle-distance runner. He competed in the men's 1500 metres at the 1928 Summer Olympics.

References

External links
 

1904 births
1999 deaths
Athletes (track and field) at the 1928 Summer Olympics
South African male middle-distance runners
South African male long-distance runners
Olympic athletes of South Africa
People from Ga-Segonyana Local Municipality